The Belgian Bowl XXIII was held on May 29, 2010. The West Flanders Tribes won their 5th consecutive title, a first in Europe.

2010 Playoffs
The 2 teams that played in the Belgian Bowl were the winners of the Semi Finals. West Flanders Tribes and Brussels Tigers received byes straight into the Semi Finals since they were the winners of seasonal play in the FFL and LFFAB respectively.

External links
Official Belgian Bowl website

American football in Belgium
Belgian Bowl
Belgian Bowl